El Afweyn District is a district in the Sanaag region of Somaliland. Its capital lies at El Afweyn.

Population
The population in 2005 was 65,797 according to the OCHA survey.

See also
Administrative divisions of Somaliland
Regions of Somaliland
Districts of Somaliland
Somalia–Somaliland border

References

External links
 Administrative map of El Afweyn District
 Districts of Somalia

Districts of Somaliland
Sanaag